This is a list of monuments in Bhaktapur District, Nepal as officially recognized by and available through the website of the Department of Archaeology, Nepal.

Bhaktapur Durbar Square is the ancient royal palace of the old Bhaktapur Kingdom. There are numerous monuments in the square. Some of the monuments in this area are listed as world heritage sites of the UNESCO.

List of monuments

|}

See also 
 List of monuments in Bagmati Province
 List of monuments in Nepal

References 

Bhaktapur